Dylana Jenson (born May 14, 1961, in Los Angeles, California) is an American concert violinist and violin teacher.  She lives in Grand Rapids, Michigan with her husband, conductor-cellist David Lockington, music director laureate of the Grand Rapids Symphony. They have four children. Jenson is the sister of Vicky Jenson, an animated film story board artist and director.

Child prodigy
Dylana Jenson was a child prodigy. She studied violin with her mother beginning at age two and ten months. She then studied with the prominent violin teacher Manuel Compinsky, the internationally renowned concert violinist Nathan Milstein and the preeminent violin pedagogue Josef Gingold. She made her debut at age eight, playing the Mendelssohn Violin Concerto.  At age nine, she appeared on a Jack Benny television special, re-enacting Benny's famous duet with Gisele MacKensie. At age eleven, she performed the Tchaikovsky Violin Concerto with the Cincinnati Symphony Orchestra with Thomas Schippers conducting. On January 17, 1973 Dylana played Henri Wieniawski's Concert Polonaise for a nationwide audience on The Tonight Show Starring Johnny Carson, preceding a comical violin solo by comedian Jack Benny. By age thirteen, she had performed with many of the leading orchestras in the U.S., including the New York Philharmonic in Avery Fisher Hall (Lincoln Center for the Performing Arts), and the Los Angeles Philharmonic. She toured Europe, Latin America and the Soviet Union. In 1978, at age seventeen and already a seasoned concert performer, she shared the silver medal in the International Tchaikovsky competition in Moscow. Nevertheless, she stopped playing altogether for several months thereafter when she experienced a lack of interest from leading concert managers. [Boris Schwarz: Great Masters of the Violin]

Later career
Jenson made her Carnegie Hall concert debut on December 9, 1980, playing the Sibelius Violin Concerto with the Philadelphia Orchestra under the direction of Eugene Ormandy. The performance was received with great acclaim. In 1981, she recorded the Sibelius Violin Concerto and the Saint-Saëns Introduction and Rondo Capriccioso with Eugene Ormandy and the Philadelphia Orchestra for RCA Red Seal. That performance is still regarded as one of the finest recordings of the Sibelius Concerto. Music critic Edward Downes characterized her work as "unsurpassed since Heifetz."

Before her marriage, Jenson had the long-term loan from a wealthy violin collector of a 1743 Guarnerius del Gesu violin,  the instrument with which she made the Sibelius recording. When she announced to her benefactor that she was to marry, she was given a short time in which to return the instrument because, he told her, if she was to marry she was not serious about a career as a concert performer.  Eventually, however, Yo Yo Ma, the preeminent cellist of his era,  referred her to Samuel Zygmuntowicz, a contemporary master violin maker in Brooklyn  who has made sound-alike copies of great antique Stradivarius and Guarnerius violins for such violin superstars as Isaac Stern and Joshua Bell. In 1995 Jenson commissioned a violin from Zygmuntowicz based on a Guarnerius del Gesu model. This was the instrument used in the recorded Carnegie Hall concert and the Shostakovitch/Barber CD recording.

In 2000, she was named Distinguished Professor of Music at Grand Valley State University in Grand Rapids, Michigan.  As of 2014, she is no longer listed as a faculty member. She recently started teaching as a visiting associate professor of violin at Notre Dame University.

In addition to her teaching career, Jenson has continued her performance career, albeit with a less heavy schedule than the most famous concert artists and usually with regional rather than top-ranked orchestras. She often performs with the Grand Rapids Symphony under the direction of her husband. These performances have included, in 2005, a triumphant return to Carnegie Hall. One critic, Harris Goldsmith of the New York Concert Review, said of this performance: "In Jenson’s hands, even lyrical passages had an intense, tremulous quality... a sizzling performance. I can give no higher praise than to say that her excellent performance brought to mind, and was a loving tribute to, the great Nathan Milstein... who was one of Jenson’s mentors."

Jenson has also appeared in the past few years with the Baltimore Symphony, the Santa Barbara Symphony, Indian Hill Orchestra (Littleton, Massachusetts), the Louisiana Philharmonic, the New Mexico Symphony, and at the Berkshire, Eastern,  and other famous music festivals. She has made tours of Australia and Japan and was made an Honorary Citizen at the age of 12 for her contributions to music in Costa Rica. Jenson plays recitals as well as concerts.

Discography
Following her 1978 Tchaikovsky Competition medal, a live performance of the  Sibelius Violin Concerto was released on the Soviet Melodiya label. Jenson's 1981 recording of the Sibelius Violin Concerto with Eugene Ormandy and the Philadelphia Orchestra was among the first of RCA Red Seal's first major classical music production recorded in digital sound. This recording received a Grammy nomination in 1982. The album was later reissued on the lower-priced RCA Victrola label and has been reissued on a customer order basis by Arkivmusic.com as part of its historical reissue series. The 2005 Carnegie Hall performance was recorded in its entirety and published by the Grand Rapids Symphony; it includes Jenson performing the Goldmark Violin Concerto No. 1. In 2008 Jenson recorded the Shostakovich 1st Violin Concerto and the Samuel Barber Violin Concerto with the London Symphony Orchestra, played on the Zygmuntowicz violin.

References

Other sources
Brahms Violin Sonata No. 3 recording: "Amazon customer reviews". Retrieved September 25, 2009.

Other reviews demonstrating high regard for the RCA Sibelius recording: Glass, Herbert (November 20 1988). "Fiddlers,Fiddlers, Fiddlers".  Los Angeles Times Retrieved September 25, 2009. See also: Meltzer, Kenneth (May 23, 1994). "Jenson's Fire, Beauty Are Back". The Baltimore Sun.  Retrieved January 27, 2023.

As to the Melodiya recording, the regard in which her RCA Sibelius recording is held, and Jenson's celebrity as a child prodigy, see: Nelson, Boris (July 26, 1981). "Recording Device Aids Sound". The Toledo Blade. See also, Smith, David L. (Winter 1982). "Recordings". Virginia Quarterly Review. pp. 29–33. Retrieved January 27, 2023.

As to the length of the hiatus in her performing career: Henningsen, Michael (February 26 - March 4, 1997). "Team Players". Weekly Alibi. Music Review.  Summarized at: "Geometry". Retrieved January 27, 2023. Also: Niles, Laurie (February 15, 2010). "Violinist.com interview with Dylana Jenson". Violinist.com.

Borrowing concert quality instruments: "Laurinel Owens Talks to Its Founders". The Strad. April 2001. Retrieved January 27, 2023.

The 2005 Carnegie Hall performance of the Goldmark Violin Concerto: Harris Goldsmith review in The Strad, quoted: "Music Teachers". Kalliope Quarter. Retrieved September 25, 2009. and Jenson biography: "Holland Symphony Orchestra". Retrieved September 25, 2008. 

A general biographical sketch:  "The Artist Series,2005-2006 Season". Calvin College. Retrieved September 25, 2009.

External links

1961 births
Musicians from Los Angeles
American classical violinists
RCA Records artists
Living people
Women classical violinists
Classical musicians from California
21st-century classical violinists
21st-century American women musicians
21st-century American violinists